Bottled Up is a 2013 American drama film written and directed by Enid Zentelis and starring Melissa Leo, Marin Ireland and Josh Hamilton.

Cast
Melissa Leo as Fay
Marin Ireland as Sylvie
Josh Hamilton as Becket
Jamie Harrold as Jerry
Fredric Lehne as Agent Rodgers

Reception
, the film holds a 33% approval rating on Rotten Tomatoes, based on six reviews with an average rating of 5.12 out of 10.  Tirdad Derakhshani of The Philadelphia Inquirer awarded the film three stars out of four.

References

External links
 
 

American drama films
2010s English-language films
2010s American films